Bagnaria Arsa is a comune (municipality) in  the Italian region Friuli-Venezia Giulia, located about  northwest of Trieste and about  south of Udine.

The municipality of Bagnaria Arsa is formed by the frazioni (subdivisions, mainly villages and hamlets) Campolonghetto, Castions delle Mura, Privano, and Sevegliano, which houses the municipal seat.

Bagnaria Arsa borders the following municipalities: Aiello del Friuli, Cervignano del Friuli, Gonars, Palmanova, Torviscosa, Visco.

References

External links
 Official website

Cities and towns in Friuli-Venezia Giulia